Gelareh Jabbari  is an Iranian social activist, actress and TV host.

Controversy 
She is one of the presenters of Iranian television who reacted to the incident of the Ukrainian plane that killed 176 people and resigned from Iranian television.

Social activity 
She is also a social activist and works in the field of books to deprived areas of Iran.

References 

1988 births
Living people
Shahid Beheshti University alumni
Iranian film actresses
Iranian television presenters
Iranian women television presenters
Iranian radio and television presenters